Birla Global University (BGU) is a private university in Bhubaneswar, Odisha, India. It was founded in 2015, by Basant Kumar Birla and Sarla Birla.

It is a self-financed private unitary University and has been established by the enactment of "Birla Global University Odisha Act, 2015", with its main campus spread over an area of nearly 30 acres of land situated at IDCO Plot No.2, Gothapatna, Bhubaneswar.

Governance
As per the Act the management of the university is carried out by a Board of Governors headed by Jayshree Mohta, chairperson, Birla Academy of Art & Culture being the main promoter of Birla Global University. Honorable Governor of Odisha is the chancellor of the university. P. P. Mathur is the Vice-Chancellor of the university, who is a distinguished scientist, educationist, and former VC of KIIT. Brajendra Kumar Das is the Registrar.

Schools
Birla School of Management
BBA (Hons.)
BBA Business Analytics (Hons.)
BBA Digital Marketing (Hons.)
MBA (Spl: Marketing, Finance, HR, Operations & Digital Marketing, Business Analytics)
Doctoral Program In Management
Birla School of Communication
BAJMC (Hons.)
MAJMC
Doctoral Program In Journalism & Mass Communication
Birla School of Social Sciences and Humanities
MA/M.Sc. in Financial Economics
Doctoral Program in Economics
Doctoral Program in English
Birla School of Commerce
B.Com (Hons.)
M.Com
Doctoral Program in Commerce
Birla School of Law
BBA.,LL.B.(Hons.)
LL.M.
Doctoral Program in Law
Birla School of Applied Sciences
B.Sc. Data Science (Hons.)
BCA
MCA
Doctoral Program in Computer Science

Partner universities
University of Ljubljana
Essca School of Management
Multimedia University
Kozminski University

References

External links

2015 establishments in Odisha
Educational institutions established in 2015
Private universities in India
Universities in Bhubaneswar